Heinrich Gotthold Arnold (March 4, 1785 in , WachauMay 3, 1854 in Dresden) was a German painter.

Life
He painted figural scenes with little girls, older women, soldiers a.s.o., portraits and sacred subjects for churches in Saxony and Poland. He became a professor at the Dresden Academy of Fine Arts himself and died in Dresden in 1854.

His self portrait is in the collection of the Dresden Art Gallery of New Masters.

See also
 List of German painters

References

Sources
 
 Friedrich von Boetticher (ed.): Malerwerke des neunzehnten jahrhunderts. Beitrag zur Kunstgeschichte. Part 1, vol. 1, 1891.
 Wilhelm Schmidt: Arnold, Heinrich Gotthold. In: Allgemeine Deutsche Biographie (ADB). vol. 1, Duncker & Humblot, Leipzig 1875, p. 588. 
 Hans Vollmer: Arnold, Heinrich Gotthold. In: Ulrich Thieme, Felix Becker (Hrsg.): Allgemeines Lexikon der Bildenden Künstler von der Antike bis zur Gegenwart. Begründet von Ulrich Thieme und Felix Becker. vol. 2: Antonio da Monza–Bassan. Wilhelm Engelmann, Leipzig 1908, p. 130–131 (Textarchiv – Internet Archive).

18th-century German painters
18th-century German male artists
German male painters
19th-century German painters
19th-century German male artists
1785 births
1854 deaths
People from Radeberg